Thursford railway station was a station in Norfolk, England on the Midland and Great Northern Joint Railway line between Melton Constable and South Lynn. It was closed in 1959 along with the rest of the line. It served the settlement of Thursford, where Station Road remains as a reminder.

References

See also
 List of closed railway stations in Norfolk

Disused railway stations in Norfolk
Former Midland and Great Northern Joint Railway stations
Railway stations in Great Britain opened in 1882
Railway stations in Great Britain closed in 1959